The  is a railway line in Chiba Prefecture, Japan, operated by the private railway operator . All of its stations with the exception of the Kazusa-Nakano terminus are within the city of  Ichihara. Diesel cars manufactured between 1961 and 1977 run through the scenic hilly areas of Bōsō Peninsula, and the line has many antique station buildings.

Stations

All trains stop at every station.

Rolling stock
, the railway owns and operates a fleet of 14 KiHa 200 series diesel cars, built by Nippon Sharyo between 1961 and 1977, and numbered 201 to 214. All except cars 209 and 210 are air-conditioned.

From 2020 though 2021, KiHa 40 series (KiHa 40 1006/2018/2019/2021/2026) had been withdrew from JR East Tadami Line, Tsugaru Line, Gono Line and Oga Line, and they had been transferred to Kominato Railway.
The vehicles, which were adopted in 2020, KiHa 40-2021 and KiHa 40-2026 were named KiHa 40-1 and KiHa 40-2 respectively, replaced part of series KiHa 200, have been operated as regular trains since they were operated at the first run as Express "SATOYAMA" in 23 April 2020.
The vehicles, which were adopted in 2021, KiHa 40-2018, KiHa 40-2019 and KiHa 40-1006 were named KiHa 40-3, KiHa 40-4 and KiHa 40-5 respectively.

From 15 November 2015, a  open-sided tourist train hauled by a replica steam locomotive powered by a diesel engine entered service on the line, operating generally at weekends only. The train consists of four coaches, two of which have open sides, with a total capacity of 144 passengers. It is hauled by diesel locomotive number DB4, a replica of a German Orenstein & Koppel-built steam locomotive formerly operated on the line from 1924 until the 1940s, powered by a Volvo diesel engine.

History
Plans for a railroad bisecting the Bōsō Peninsula were drafted by the Railway Ministry in the Meiji period, with the aim of connecting the town of Kominato (now part of Kamogawa City), a town facing the Pacific and famous as the birthplace of Nichiren, for economic and military reasons. However, due to lack of profitability of other lines in the area, the idea was shelved.

The project was revived in 1917 by noted entrepreneur Yasuda Zenjirō, who used the financial resources of the Yasuda zaibatsu to fund over half of the construction costs, and who imported two steam locomotives from the Baldwin Locomotive Works in Philadelphia, Pennsylvania to run on the new line.

Diesel railcars were introduced on the line from this date. At Kazusa-Nakano, the line connected with the Japanese Government Railways Kihara Line, which provided a route to the eastern shore of the Bōsō Peninsula and so plans to extend the line further to Kominato Town were subsequently abandoned.

In 1942, the line was forced to merge with the Keisei Electric Railway, and remained a subsidiary of that company after the end of World War II. On 21 March 1962, the remaining steam locomotives were retired (and are currently on display at Goi Station). Freight operations were phased out by 1 October 1969. A new ATS was installed in early 1995.

In 2017, the line received a Good Design Award from the Japan Institute of Design Promotion.

References

External links

  

 
Railway lines in Japan
Railway lines in Chiba Prefecture
Railway lines opened in 1925
1067 mm gauge railways in Japan